Petropavlovsk may refer to:

Places
Petropavlovsk, Kazakhstan, a city in the North Province of Kazakhstan
Petropavlovsk-Kamchatsky, a city in Kamchatka Krai, informally and formerly officially known simply as Petropavlovsk.
Petropavlovsk, Chuvash Republic, a selo (village) in Magarinskoye Rural Settlement of Shumerlinsky District in the Chuvash Republic
Petropavlovsk, Bolshesosnovsky District, Perm Krai, a selo in Bolshesosnovsky District of Perm Krai
Petropavlovsk, Oktyabrsky District, Perm Krai, a selo in Oktyabrsky District of Perm Krai
Petropavlovsk, Sakha Republic, a selo in Petropavlovsky Rural Okrug of Ust-Maysky District in the Sakha Republic

Alternative names
Petropavlovsk South, alternative name of Petropavlovsk Airport in Kazakhstan
Petropavlovsk, alternative name of Petropavlovskoye, a selo in Petropavlovskoye Settlement of Pavinsky District in Kostroma Oblast;

Ships
Russian ironclad Petropavlovsk, launched in 1865.
Russian battleship Petropavlovsk (1894), Imperial Russia (1897–1904)
Russian battleship Petropavlovsk (1911), a Gangut-class battleship in the Baltic Fleet (1914–1953)
Petropavlovsk resolution, a list of demands by the crew of the battleship during the Kronstadt rebellion
Former German cruiser Lützow (1939),  renamed Petropavlovsk after her sale to the Soviet Union in 1940
Soviet cruiser Kaganovich,  renamed Petropavlovsk in 1957

Other
Petropavlovsk plc, a mining company listed on the London Stock Exchange
Siege of Petropavlovsk, a battle of the Crimean War at Petropavlovsk-Kamchatsky

See also
Petropavlovsky (disambiguation)

Saints Peter and Paul